The 2000 NCAA Division I-A football season ended with the Oklahoma Sooners beating the defending national champion Florida State Seminoles to claim the Sooners' seventh national championship and their thirty-seventh conference championship, the first of each since the departure of head coach Barry Switzer.

Oklahoma coach Bob Stoops was in his second season as head coach, having been the defensive coordinator of Steve Spurrier's 1996 National Champion Florida Gators, and also having helped Bill Snyder turn the Kansas State Wildcats around in the early 1990s. Stoops erased a three-game losing streak against rival Texas by a score of 63–14, one of the worst defeats in Texas' football history. Despite the lopsided victory, this game marked a return of the Red River Shootout to a rivalry game with national title implications.

The BCS title game, held at the Orange Bowl that year, was not without controversy, as the system shut fourth-ranked Washington out of the championship game, despite being the only team who had beaten each No. 2 Miami and No. 5 Oregon State and having the same 10–1 record as No. 3 Florida State during the regular season.  10–1 Miami, who handed No. 3 Florida State their only loss, was ranked higher in both the AP Writers' Poll and the ESPN/USA Today Coaches' Poll, and had the same record as the Seminoles, was also seen as a possible title contender.

Virginia Tech also was left out of the BCS bowls, despite being ranked higher than one of the at-large teams, Notre Dame.

The South Carolina Gamecocks broke a 21-game losing streak, stretching back into 1998, to go 8–4 including a win over Ohio State in the Outback Bowl.

Two new bowl games began in the 2000 season: the Silicon Valley Bowl, which had a contractual tie-in with the WAC, and the Galleryfurniture.com Bowl.

Rules changes
The following rules changes were passed by the NCAA Rules Committee in 2000:
 The definition of an illegal block is expanded to include any high-low or low-high combination block by any two offensive players when the initial contact clearly occurs beyond the neutral zone.
 Crack-back blocks are now prohibited from any offensive player in motion in any direction (previously it was in motion toward the ball) and the restricted zone is now 10 yards beyond the neutral zone in all directions.
 Offensive teams in the process of substituting or simulated substituting are prohibited from rushing to the line of scrimmage to snap the ball to give the defense a disadvantage.  The penalty for a first offense is five yards, additional violations are considered unsportsmanlike conduct (15 yards).
 Defensive players lined up within one yard of the line of scrimmage are prevented from rushing up to the line with the obvious intent of causing an offensive player to false start.
 Passers who are not within five yards of the sideline from the original position of the ball (aka the "tackle box") are allowed to throw the ball so it lands beyond the neutral zone without penalty.

Conference and program changes
Two teams upgraded from Division I-AA, thus increasing the number of Division I-A schools from 114 to 116.
Nevada left the Big West Conference to become the ninth member of the Western Athletic Conference.
Two new teams joined Division I-A football this season: the University of Connecticut and the University of South Florida.

Regular season top 10 matchups
Rankings reflect the AP Poll. Rankings for Week 9 and beyond will list BCS Rankings first and AP Poll second. Teams that failed to be a top 10 team for one poll or the other will be noted.
Week 6
No. 7 Miami defeated No. 1 Florida State, 27–24 (Miami Orange Bowl, Miami, Florida)
Week 7
No. 8 Oklahoma defeated No. 2 Kansas State, 41–31 (KSU Stadium, Manhattan, Kansas)
Week 9
No. 2/3 Oklahoma defeated No. 1/1 Nebraska, 31–14 (Oklahoma Memorial Stadium, Norman, Oklahoma)
Week 10
No. 3/4 Florida State defeated No. 13/10 Clemson, 54–7 (Doak Campbell Stadium, Tallahassee, Florida)
No. 5/3 Miami defeated No. 2/2 Virginia Tech, 41–21 (Miami Orange Bowl, Miami, Florida)
Week 12
No. 3/3 Florida State defeated No. 4/4 Florida, 30–7 (Doak Campbell Stadium, Tallahassee, Florida)
No. 9/8 Oregon State defeated No. 7/5 Oregon, 23–13 (Reser Stadium, Corvallis, Oregon)
Week 14
No. 1/1 Oklahoma defeated No. 9/8 Kansas State, 27–24 (2000 Big 12 Championship Game, Arrowhead Stadium, Kansas City, Missouri)

Conference standings

Bowl games

BCS bowls
Orange Bowl: No. 1 Oklahoma (BCS No. 1) 13, No. 3 Florida State (BCS No. 2) 2
Rose Bowl: 	No. 4 Washington (Pac 10 co-champ) 34, No. 14 Purdue (Big Ten co-Champ) 24
Fiesta Bowl: No. 5 Oregon State (At Large [Pac 10 co-champ]) 41, No. 10 Notre Dame (At Large) 9
Sugar Bowl: No. 2 Miami (Big East Champ) 37, No. 7 Florida (SEC Champ) 20

Other New Year's Day bowls
Cotton Bowl Classic: No. 11 Kansas State (Big 12 runner-up) 35, No. 21 Tennessee 21
Florida Citrus Bowl: No. 17 Michigan (Big Ten co-champ) 31, No. 20 Auburn (SEC runner-up) 28
Gator Bowl: No. 6 Virginia Tech 41, No. 16 Clemson 20
Outback Bowl: South Carolina 24, No. 19 Ohio State 7

December bowl games
Holiday Bowl: No. 8 Oregon (Pac 10 co-champ) 35, No. 12 Texas 30
Peach Bowl: LSU 28, No. 15 Georgia Tech 14
MicronPC.com Bowl: NC State 38, Minnesota 30
Sun Bowl: Wisconsin 21, UCLA 20
Alamo Bowl: No. 9 Nebraska 66, No. 18 Northwestern (Big Ten co-champ) 17
Insight.com Bowl: Iowa State 37, Pittsburgh 29
Liberty Bowl: No. 23 Colorado State (MWC champ) 22, No. 22 Louisville (C-USA champ) 17
Aloha Bowl: Boston College 31, Arizona State 17
Oahu Bowl: No. 24 Georgia 37, Virginia 14
Independence Bowl: Mississippi State 43, Texas A&M 41 (OT)
Music City Bowl: West Virginia 49, Mississippi 38
Las Vegas Bowl: UNLV 31, Arkansas 14
Motor City Bowl: Marshall (MAC champ) 25, Cincinnati 14
Humanitarian Bowl: Boise State (Big West champ) 38, UTEP (WAC co-champ) 23
Mobile Alabama Bowl: Southern Miss 28, No. 13 TCU (WAC co-champ) 21
Silicon Valley Classic: Air Force 37, Fresno State 34
Galleryfurniture.com bowl: East Carolina 40, Texas Tech 27

Final polls

Heisman Trophy voting
The Heisman Memorial Trophy Award is given to the Most Outstanding Player of the year.

Winner: Chris Weinke, Florida State (1628 points)
2. Josh Heupel, Oklahoma (1552 points)
3. Drew Brees, Purdue (619 points)
4. LaDainian Tomlinson, TCU (566 points)
5. Damien Anderson, Northwestern (101 points)

Other major awards
Maxwell Award (College Player of the Year) – Drew Brees, Purdue
Walter Camp Award (Back) – Josh Heupel, Oklahoma
Davey O'Brien Award (Quarterback) – Chris Weinke, Florida State
Johnny Unitas Golden Arm Award (Senior quarterback) – Chris Weinke, Florida State
Doak Walker Award (Running back) – LaDainian Tomlinson, TCU
Fred Biletnikoff Award (Wide receiver) – Antonio Bryant, Pittsburgh
Bronko Nagurski Trophy (Defensive player) – Dan Morgan, Miami
Chuck Bednarik Award – Dan Morgan, Miami
Dick Butkus Award (Linebacker) – Dan Morgan, Miami
Lombardi Award (Lineman or Linebacker) – Jamal Reynolds, Florida State
Outland Trophy (Interior lineman) – John Henderson, Tennessee, DT
Jim Thorpe Award (Defensive back) – Jamar Fletcher, Wisconsin
Lou Groza Award (Placekicker) – Jonathan Ruffin, Cincinnati
Paul "Bear" Bryant Award – Bob Stoops, Oklahoma

References